Kanhaiyalal may refer to:

Kanhaiyalal (actor) (1910–1982), Bollywood actor in Hindi films
Kanhaiyalal Maneklal Munshi, (1887–1971), Indian independence movement activist, politician, writer and educationist
Kanhaiyalal Sethia (1919–2008), Rajasthani and Hindi poet
Murder of Kanhaiya Lal in 2022